Black people, Africans and people of African descent have lived in Ireland in small numbers since the 18th century. Throughout the 18th century they were mainly concentrated in the major cities and towns, especially in the Limerick, Cork, Belfast, Kinsale, Waterford, and Dublin areas. Increases in immigration have led to the growth of the community across Ireland. According to the 2016 Census of Population, 39,834 people identify as Black or Black Irish with an African background, whereas 2,863 people claim to have descended from any other Black background.

History

During the 18th century it was common and even fashionable for middle-class Irish families to take Black servants into their households as a sign of wealth and prestige.  In particular, having a young Black servant attend an Irish lady of the house was considered a sign of exceptional wealth and high position in society. One of the most well-known Black servants in Ireland during this time was Tony Small.  During the American Revolutionary War (1775-1783), Small fled his owners from South Carolina, finding Lord Edward Fitzgerald in a near-death condition and assisting his recovery. Subsequently, Lord Fitzgerald returned to Ireland, where Tony Small became a dear friend to the family. Later, on a trip to London, Tony met his future wife, a French maid named Julia. The couple later had three children, Moirico, Harriet Pamela and Edward, moved to London and established a business.

Although many Black servants in Irish households were enslaved Africans, not all Black people in Ireland during this period were enslaved. Many were independent domestic workers, travelling musicians, artists, soldiers and tradesmen. Others were servants who received a salary and were considered free people. A number of formerly enslaved Black Americans relocated to Ireland. In addition to Tony Small, the preacher John Jea and the scholar William G. Allen both resided in Ireland for several years.

Many Black people who settled in Ireland assimilated into the wider Irish population, including entering into mixed marriages and having children with white Irish people. ‘Mulatto Jack’ was also a child of interracial marriage. Abducted from Ireland in the early 18th century, he was subsequently sold as a slave in Antigua. After helping plot a slave rebellion, he was discovered by the colonists, and his release was negotiated for several months until agreed upon provided his instant deportation back to Ireland. The Black Irish singer, Rachel Baptist, is also thought to have married a white spouse in the 1760s.

Formerly enslaved people who visited or toured Ireland included Olaudah Equiano and Frederick Douglass.

Afro-Caribbean people descended from Irish immigrants in the Caribbean, especially those on Barbados, Jamaica, and Montserrat, often have Irish surnames, speak a form of Caribbean English influenced by the Irish vernacular and, in some cases, sing Irish songs.

Since Partition

Republic of Ireland

1960s
In the 1960s, the Irish government ran schemes aimed at attracting students from African nations, with the aim of providing them with skills that would be useful in the growth of newly independent countries. In 1962, there were 1,100 African students in Ireland, comprising roughly a tenth of the student population. Many of these schemes were facilitated using links between Irish missionary organizations. This also included military training, with a military college taking on a delegation of Zambian cadets in 1967, citing Ireland's lack of a history of imperialism. Their stay was mostly temporary since many returned to their countries after graduating and gaining sufficient skills to prosper back home. However, throughout the 1960s until roughly the 1990s, the African population in Ireland, although remaining relatively small, consisted not only of students but of visitors and professionals, like doctors.

Celtic Tiger Era
The increase of Ireland's non-white population started with the Irish boom of 1997 to 2009 is due in part to the laws which had governed Irish citizenship since the creation of the Republic of Ireland in 1937. These laws, which granted citizenship jus soli, were, for a period, interpreted by the Department of Justice as allowing parents who were not Irish citizens to remain in the state based on the rights of their Irish-born citizen children. In 2001 the government under Taoiseach Bertie Ahern sent Tánaiste Mary Harney on a world trip to invite people to come to Ireland. Harney visited 5 countries in Africa, including Nigeria and South Africa which eventually saw many people migrating to Ireland. This automatic granting of residency ceased in 2007, following a decision of the Supreme Court. 
Due to the fact that Ireland is Anglophone, and the large amount of immigration between the United Kingdom and the Republic, the vast majority of Black people in Ireland are immigrants (or descended from) Commonwealth countries in the Caribbean and Africa. The Twenty-seventh Amendment of the Constitution of Ireland changed the qualifications for Irish citizenship in 2004.

The 2006 Irish census recorded 40,525 people of Black African ethnicity and 3,793 people of any other Black background resident in the Republic out of a total population of 4,172,013, meaning that 1.06 percent of the population self-identified as Black. The preliminary results of the 2011 census recorded 58,697 people of Black African ethnicity and 6,381 people of any other Black background resident in the Republic out of a total population of 4,525,281, meaning that 1.42 per cent of the population self-identified as Black.

The Celtic Tiger boom of 1992–2007 also increased immigration into Ireland from all parts of the world, including Africa, and this led to delays in processing applications at the Garda National Immigration Bureau. For non-EU persons, this led to restrictive laws and hundreds of deportations annually of those not qualifying for asylum or admission. Some failed asylum cases received considerable media attention, such as that of Pamela Izevbekhai, who claimed that her daughters were likely to be subjected to female genital mutilation following deportation, and that another daughter had died from the same procedure in 1994. Despite presenting her case to the Seanad in 2008 and as far as the Supreme Court of Ireland and European Court of Human Rights, the court found in 2011 that her use of forged documents was "inadequate".

Individual areas have been noted as having larger groups of people descended from Sub-Saharan Africa than most of the country. The town of Gort, Co. Galway, is home to a large Brazilian population, including Black and mixed-race individuals.

2010s and present
Following the European migrant crisis of 2015, refugees from conflict zones in North, East and Central Africa, such as Eritrea, Sudan, Somalia, the Congo, and Burundi have settled in Ireland.

There are a number of challenges noted by Ireland's Black people, including casual racism, persistence of stereotypes, and inequal treatment in education.

Many refugees from African countries reside in Ireland's Direct Provision system, an intake system for asylum seekers that has been frequently condemned for its drawn-out processing timelines and poor quality of life.

Northern Ireland

World War II
A number of African American soldiers were stationed in Northern Ireland as part of American involvement in World War II. The reaction of those in Northern Ireland was 'largely color-blind', with acceptance generally offered from both Catholic and Protestant communities, who viewed the visiting soldiers primarily as American. The Stormont government refused to enact segregation laws at the behest of the American military, though there were instances of unofficial segregation and racism, largely drawn from ignorance. It is suggested that there was, however, differing treatment of white American and black American troops by the Northern Irish population, especially in the later years of the war. The lack of a color bar, by and large, in treatment in Northern Ireland led to feelings that equality was attainable at home as it was abroad. Many women who involved themselves in relationships with American soldiers, black or white, risked ostracism by their community. Much media coverage of black American troops relied heavily on stereotypes, even when coverage was largely positive. Despite the Stormont Government not keeping records of the births of mixed-race children, official and unofficial sources note the birth of several. The equal treatment between white and black soldiers was also noted as causing significant anger among the white soldiers.

The Troubles
A number of black people from mainland Britain were stationed in Northern Ireland during The Troubles, as part of British Army deployments. A small number of the 3,000 victims of violence during The Troubles were black, both British Army soldiers and civilians.

Post-Good Friday Agreement
At the time of the 2001 UK Census, of the total population of Northern Ireland (1,685,267), 255 people described their ethnicity as Black Caribbean, 494 as Black African and 387 as Other Black, meaning that the total Black population was 1,136. These figures do not include individuals who described themselves as being of mixed-race. The UK census of 2011 recorded 3,616 Black people in Northern Ireland (0.2% of the total population). The next census will be in 2021.

As well as help from the Equality Commission for Northern Ireland, the EU-funded Afro-Community Support Organisation Northern Ireland (ACSONI) was formed in 2003 to represent the views of black people. ACSONI prepared a report in 2011 on other residents' perceptions and general knowledge of Africa and Africans.

Mother and Baby Homes
It was noted that approximately 275 mixed-race children were born and held in Mother and Baby Homes between 1922 and 1998. Pregnancies between White Irish and black couples rarely resulted in marriage, with resulting children often taken into these institutions, leaving them with incomplete records of family history. Mixed-race children were subject to discrimination in these institutions, with fewer being offered for adoption at the same rate as White Irish babies. Many were sent to 'reject wards' for children deemed 'unadoptable' on the basis of their skin color. A report into the Mother and Baby Homes denied there was racial discrimination within these institutions.

A prominent example of racial discrimination against mixed-race children in Ireland and across Britain is the study conducted by anthropologists Rachel Fleming and Herbert Fleur in 1924. It investigated the physical appearances of Black Irish children and described their unique features in terms of race. They highlighted the “otherness” of these children by closely comparing their features to those of purely British children, suggesting they could never look or be the same. In 1930 Muriel Fletcher, a social scientist, produced a similar report, although focusing on the psychological aspects of mixed-race relationships and their children. Both investigations concluded that the physical and moral characteristics of mixed-race children are defective and will prevent them from integrating into society in the future.

During World War II, specifically from 1942 until 1945, a large number of Black American soldiers were stationed across the UK. Predominantly rural positions of their military bases often resulted in mixed-race relationships between White British and Irish women and African American GIs. These relations rarely lead to marriage, although frequently to pregnancies. Children of such alliances often ended up in Mother and Baby Homes, given up for adoption, although some remained in their mothers’ families, despite being a product of war-time affairs. However, mixed-race babies were not only children of American GIs, but also of African students.

Black Irish in politics
Ireland has never elected a Teachta Dála (TD) or Senator of African descent. Likewise, there has never been any Black cabinet member, or leader of a major government institution. Black people are significantly underrepresented in Irish politics. A number of reasons are suggested for this lack of representation, including that people of African descent tend to be younger than the rest of the population, the PR-STV voting system failing to facilitate representation of minorities not clustered in a single geographic area, as well as the highly personalised nature of Irish politics being difficult for immigrants to make vital political connections.

In 2007, Nigerian refugee and politician Rotimi Adebari was elected as mayor of Portlaoise, the first Black mayor in Ireland. In 2011, Darren Scully resigned as mayor of Naas after stating he would refuse to represent "black Africans" because of their "aggressiveness and bad manners".

In 2018, artist Kevin Sharkey unsuccessfully sought nomination to contest the Presidential Election, failing to be nominated by either councils or the Oireachtas.

As of 2021, there are only two Black councillors out of 949 - Cllr. Uruemu Adejinmi, who represents Fianna Fáil on Longford County Council, and Cllr. Yemi Adenuga, a former Gogglebox Ireland star who represents Fine Gael on Meath County Council. Adenuga was the first Black female councillor elected in Ireland. In 2021, Adejinmi unsuccessfully sought the Fianna Fáil nomination for the 2021 Seanad By-Election. Former asylum seeker Ellie Kisyombe, originally from Malawi, ran for Dublin's North Inner City constituency with the Social Democrats during the 2019 Local Elections, becoming the first former asylum seeker to seek election in the Republic of Ireland. She failed to get elected, after discrepancies in her timeline for application for asylum emerged.

In June 2021, Lilian Seenoi-Barr was co-opted by the SDLP to the Derry and Strabane District Council, becoming Northern Ireland's first Black councillor.

Impacts on Irish culture and integration

Religion
Immigration from Africa has been noted as increasing the numbers of Protestant adherents in Ireland, contributing to the reversal in the decline of numbers. A number of Catholic priests are also noted as immigrating to Ireland from African nations, owing to the declining amount of priests in Irish parishes.

Poetry, written, and spoken work
The poem 'For Our Mothers', by Nigerian-Irish poet Felicia Olusanya (FeliSpeaks) is featured on the 2023 Leaving Certificate curriculum. Author Emma Dabiri is one of a number of Irish authors with African heritage.

In July 2021, the team from Maynooth University, consisting of Rí Anumudu and Chikemka Abuchi-Ogbonda, became the first Black Irish team to win the prestigious Irish Times Debating Competition.

Irish language
A number of Irish people of African descent are noted as being Gaeilgeoirs (speakers of the Irish language), and contributing to the evolution of the language.

Sport
A number of players on Ireland's football team are of African descent.

In media

Notable people

Black people in Ireland

 Rotimi Adebari, Irish politician 
 Ifrah Ahmed, Irish social activist 
 Kwame Ampadu, Irish former footballer 
 Robert Baloucoune, Irish rugby union player 
 Gavin Bazunu, Irish goalkeeper 
 Denise Chaila, Irish Zambian rapper, singer, poet, grime and hip hop artist 
 Erica Cody,  Irish R&B singer-songwriter 
 Christine Buckley, Irish activist 
 Ultan Dillane, Irish Rugby player 
 Lucia Evans, Irish-Zimbabwean singer 
 Kwaku Fortune,  Irish actor
Garnett sisters, Irish singer-songwriters of Sierra Leonean descent
 Marsha Hunt, American actress, singer, and writer 
 Adam Idah, Irish professional footballer 
 Kamal Ibrahim, Irish television presenter and actor 
 Laura Izibor, Irish recording artist 
Jafaris, Irish rapper, singer and songwriter 
 Roberto Lopes footballer 
 Paul McGrath, Irish former footballer 
 Omero Mumba, Irish actor and singer 
 Samantha Mumba, Irish actor and singer 
 Ruth Negga, Irish actress 
 Cassia O'Reilly, Irish singer-songwriter and music producer 
 Paul Osam, Irish former footballer 
 Kevin Sharkey, Irish artist, political activist, and former television presenter 
 Christopher Simpson, Irish actor of Irish-Greek-Rwandan descent 
 Rejjie Snow, Irish rapper 
 Soulé, Irish pop singer-songwriter 
 Darren Sutherland former boxer 
 Pamela Uba, Irish scientist, model and Miss Ireland 2021 
 Derrick Williams, Irish footballer 
 Simon Zebo, Irish rugby union player
 Caleb Folan
 Leon Best
 Steven Reid

Black Irish emigrants

Emigrants to France
 Kwame Ampadu, Irish former footballer

Emigrants to Great Britain

 Emma Dabiri, author, academic, and broadcaster 
 Layla Flaherty, Irish actress and model 
 Rianna Jarrett, Irish footballer 
 Phil Lynott, English-born Irish rock singer. Bassist and lead vocalist of Thin Lizzy 
 Cassia O'Reilly, Irish singer-songwriter
 Darren Randolph, Irish footballer 
 Christopher Simpson, Irish actor

Emigrants to United States
 Samantha Mumba, Irish pop singer 
 Ruth Negga, Irish actor 
 Fionnghuala O'Reilly represented Ireland at the Miss Universe 2019 pageant

Born, raised and resident in Britain
 Cyrus Christie, footballer 
 John Conteh, former boxer 
 Gabriel Gbadamosi, writer, poet 
 Kit de Waal, Irish writer 
 Craig Charles, English-born Irish actor 
 Dolores Mantez, Irish actress 
 Liam George, footballer 
 Chris Hughton, former footballer 
 Henry Hughton, former footballer 
 David McGoldrick, footballer
 Clinton Morrison, former footballer 
 Lanre Oyebanjo, footballer 
 Annie Yellowe Palma, British author

References

African diaspora in Europe
 Ire
Ireland
Ethnic groups in Ireland
Black Irish people